Monteswar Assembly constituency is an assembly constituency in Purba Bardhaman district in the Indian state of West Bengal.

Overview
As per orders of the Delimitation Commission, No. 263 Monteswar assembly constituency covers Baghsan, Vagra Mulgram, Denur, Jamna, Kusumgram, Majhergram, Mamudpur I, Monteswar, Pipalan and Shushunia gram panchayats of Manteswar community development block and Barapalason I, Barapalason II, Bohar I, Bohar II, Bijur I, Bijur II and Satgachhia I gram panchayats of Memari II community development block.

Monteswar assembly segment was earlier part of Katwa (Lok Sabha constituency). As per orders of Delimitation Commission it is part of No. 39 Bardhaman-Durgapur (Lok Sabha constituency).

Members of Legislative Assembly

Election results

2021

2016 by-election

2016

2011

 

.# Swing calculated on Congress+Trinamool Congress vote percentages in 2006 taken together.

1977-2006
Narayan Hazra Chowdhury of Trinamool Congress lost the Monteswar Assembly seat in 2006 defeated by Chaudhuri Md. Hedayatullah of CPI(M) . Contests in most years were multi cornered but only winners and runners are being mentioned. In 2001, 1996 and 1991, Abu Ayesh Mondal of CPI(M) defeated Narayan Hazara Choudhury of Trinamool Congress, Debabrata Roy of Congress and Biseswar Bhattacharya of Congress in the respective years. In 1982 and 1977, Hemanta Roy of CPI(M) defeated Tuhin Samanta of Congress.

1951-1972
In 1972, Tuhin Samanta of Congress won the seat. In 1971 and 1969, Kashinath Hazra Choudhury of CPI(M) won the seat. N.C.Chaudhuri of Congress won the seat in 1967. Syed Abul Mansur Habibullah of CPI won the seat in 1962. Bhakta Chandra Roy (Independent) won the seat in 1957.  Ananda Prasad Mondal of Congress won the seat in independent India's first election in 1951.

References

Politics of Paschim Bardhaman district
Assembly constituencies of West Bengal
Politics of Purba Bardhaman district